The 2010 Rangitikei local elections were held across the Rangitikei District of Manawatū-Whanganui, New Zealand, for the offices of Mayor of Rangitikei and eleven members of the Rangitikei District Council on 9 October 2010. They were held as part of the 2010 New Zealand local elections. Postal ballots were issued to 10,068 registered voters, and were returned from 17 September to 9 October. Across the district, 3,619 people cast votes, a voter turnout of 47%.

Chalky Leary was re-elected as mayor unopposed, becoming the first mayor in 21 years to be re-elected without a challenge. First past the post (FPP) was used to elect the eleven members of the Rangitikei District Council—four from the Marton ward, three from the Taihape ward, two from the Bulls ward and one each from the Hunterville and Turakina wards.

The previous local elections took place in October 2007 and the following elections in October 2013.

Mayor

As there were no other candidates, Chalky Leary was re-elected unopposed.

District council

Bulls ward
The two candidates with the most votes were elected, shown in the table below by a green tick. Candidates shown with a cross lost their seats as incumbent councillors.

Hunterville ward
The candidate with the most votes was elected, shown in the table below by a green tick. Candidates shown with a cross lost their seats as incumbent councillors.

Marton ward
The four candidates with the most votes were elected, shown in the table below by a green tick. Candidates shown with a cross lost their seats as incumbent councillors.

Taihape ward
As there were no other candidates, all three candidates were elected unopposed.

Turakina ward
The candidate with the most votes was elected, shown in the table below by a green tick.

See also
2013 Rangitikei local elections
2010 New Zealand local elections

References

Rangitikei
Politics of Rangitikei
Rangitikei